The 2016 Women's Knockout Cup is New Zealand's women's 23rd knockout football competition.

The 2016 competition had three rounds before quarter-finals, semi-finals, and a final. Competition was run in three regions (northern, central, southern) until the quarter-finals, from which stage the draw was open. In all, 43 teams entered the competition.

The 2016 final
The 2016 final was played between two Auckland teams Forrest Hill Milford and Glenfield Rovers at QBE Stadium before the men's Chatham Cup final. This was Forrest Hill-Milford second final appearance, having lost previously in the 2014 final, while Glenfield Rovers had won the cup the last two seasons and was looking for the three-peat. Forrest Hill-Milford won the game 4–3 on penalties after finishing 1–1 at full time and 2–2 at the end of extra time. Tessa Berger was the winner of the Maia Jackman trophy for the most valuable player. This final is also notable for being the first women's final to be televised live in New Zealand.

Results

Round 1
Northern Region

Central/Capital Region

Mainland Region

Southern Region

All teams listed below received byes to the second round.
Northern Region: Claudelands Rovers, Eastern Suburbs, Ellerslie, Forrest Hill Milford, Glenfield Rovers, Hamilton Wanderers, Hibiscus Coast, Lynn-Avon United, Metro FC, Norwest United, Papatoetoe AFC, Three Kings United, Western Springs.
Central/Capital Region: Seatoun, Upper Hutt City, Valeron Wanderers FC, Wellington United.
Mainland Region: Cashmere Technical FC, Coastal Spirit FC, Waimak United FC.
Southern Region: Dunedin Technical, Otago University AFC, Roslyn-Wakari AFC.

Round 2

Northern Region

Central/Capital Region

Mainland Region

Southern Region

Though Claudelands Rovers beat Three Kings United 3–2, they were found to have fielded an ineligible player so Three Kings United was awarded the 3–0 win and moved onto the 3rd round.

Round 3

Northern Region

Central/Capital Region

Mainland/Southern Region

Quarter-finals

Semi-finals

Final

References

External links
Women's knockout cup section on the New Zealand Football website

Women's Knockout Cup/Kate Sheppard Cup
Women's Knockout Cup
Women's Knockout Cup
Women's Knockout Cup
football